Josh Doig (born 18 May 2002) is a Scottish professional footballer who plays as a defender for Serie A club Hellas Verona. He has previously played for Hibernian and Queen's Park, and has represented Scotland at the under-21 level.

Club career

Hibernian
Doig first signed with Hibernian during the summer of 2019, having previously been in the youth system of their Edinburgh derby rivals Hearts. In February 2020, he signed a contract with Hibernian that is due to run until the summer of 2023 and he was loaned to League Two club Queen's Park for the rest of the 2019–20 season.

Doig was added to the Hibs first team squad ahead of the 2020–21 season, and he made his first competitive appearance for the club on 1 August 2020 in a 2–1 win against Kilmarnock. Doig played regularly for Hibs during the 2020–21 season, and in January 2021 it was reported by BBC Sport that English Premier League clubs and Celtic had expressed interest in signing him. Doig scored his first senior goal on 20 February 2021, in a 2–0 win for Hibs against Hamilton. Doig then signed a new contract with Hibs, which was due expire in the summer of 2025. At the end of his breakthrough season with Hibs, Doig won the SFWA Young Player of the Year award.

Amid transfer speculation, Doig returned to Hibernian’s squad starting in his first game back against Ross County where Hibernian won 3–0 on 9 August 2021.
On 20 November 2021, Doig signed a new long-term contract at Hibernian. Hibs accepted an offer of over £3 million for Doig from Italian club Verona in July 2022.

Hellas Verona
Doig completed his move to Verona on 13 July 2022, signing a four-year contract with the Italian side. He scored a goal in his first start for Verona, a 2–1 win against Sampdoria on 4 September.

International career
Doig was selected in a Scotland U18 squad in September 2019, and played in a 2–1 win against Paraguay. The following month, he was selected in the Scotland U19 squad.

In May 2021, after a successful individual season for Doig in which he was named the SFWA Young Player of the Year, he was selected for the Scotland U21 team squad. He was later forced to withdraw through injury.

Doig was added to the full Scotland squad for the first time in September 2022.

Career statistics

Honours
Individual
SPFL Premiership Team of the Season: 2020–21
SFWA Young Player of the Year: 2020–21
Hibernian Young Player of the Year: 2020–21
SFA Young Player of the Year nominee: 2021-22
SFWA Young Player of the Year nominee: 2021-22

References

2002 births
Living people
Scottish footballers
Association football defenders
Heart of Midlothian F.C. players
Hibernian F.C. players
Queen's Park F.C. players
Scottish Professional Football League players
Scotland youth international footballers
Footballers from Edinburgh
Scotland under-21 international footballers
Scottish expatriate footballers
Scottish expatriate sportspeople in Italy
Expatriate footballers in Italy
Hellas Verona F.C. players
Serie A players